Kalluveene Nudiyithu is a 1983 Indian Kannada-language film, directed by Thipatur Raghu and produced by Smt Kalpana Pandu. The film stars Vishnuvardhan in a double role. The film has musical score by M. Ranga Rao.

Cast

Vishnuvardhan (Double role)
Aarathi
Jayanthi
Padmapriya
Udaykumar
Chandrashekar
Jai Jagadish
Bhavya
Dinesh
Shakti Prasad
Dheerendra Gopal
Shashikala
Prashanthi
Mamatha
M. S. Umesh
M. S. Karanth
Jr. Narasimharaju
Aravind

Soundtrack
The music was composed by M. Ranga Rao.

References

External links
 

1983 films
1980s Kannada-language films
Films scored by M. Ranga Rao